Cinemania is a 2002 German/American documentary about five obsessed cinemaphiles, who, throughout the year, each see two to five films a day and work out a daily schedule to see them in theatres across New York City.

Cast
Eric Chadbourne — A cinephile who lives on disability benefits, and who vociferously prefers musicals and romantic-comedies to foreign films. He is the only profiled character in the documentary who has succumbed to watching films on video, of which he seems to own thousands (the others steadfastly refuse to watch TV under any circumstances; Roberta Hill states that she "only has nightmares in video.")
Harvey Schwartz — A cinephile who has traits found among those with Asperger syndrome, who lives on disability benefits. According to Jack, Harvey has no discerning taste in film and will watch just about anything, including The Amazing Crab Monster. He can quote the exact running time of every film he's ever seen from memory. He owns hundreds of soundtrack LPs but doesn't have a turntable.
Bill Heidbreder — A cinephile who defines his taste in film as "effeminate", as he prefers "relationship" films to action films. He is an NYU grad student and amateur philosopher who lives on unemployment benefits.
Jack Angstreich — The most heavily profiled member of the quintet, Jack's justification for his abnormal behavior is to not deny what he considers to be a "visionary" lifestyle, that there is no "correct" way to live, and really has no interest in real life beyond the cinema. He claims that he wouldn't want to make love to Rita Hayworth unless he was doing it in black-and-white. Living off an inheritance, Jack sees upwards of five films per day (and claims to have seen over 1,000 films in eight months at one point), and deliberately eats a constipating diet so he won't be interrupted while watching a film and have to go to the bathroom.

Roberta Hill

Hill was born June 18, 1936, in Washington, D.C., a daughter of Robert L. and Dorothy (née Dyar) Hill, and a granddaughter of Harrison Gray Dyar Jr. She lived for most of her life in Washington, D.C., moving in 1983 to New York City, where she died on July 18, 2009. An obsessive-compulsive woman who, according to Jack, "is so far in the prison [of cinephilia], that to me, it's just a hopeless, Sisyphean lifestyle." Has kept every piece of film-memorabilia she's got her hands on for what appears to be the last five decades, including ticket-stubs, programs, fliers, a promotional bottle of water from an independent film called Water, and promotional plastic cups from Last Action Hero and Jurassic Park. Roberta has been banned from many theaters for her rude and uncouth behavior, which has included attacking ushers who have torn too much paper off her ticket-stubs.

See also
 2002 in film

References

External links
 
 Film on YouTube
 
 
 
 2012 Interview with Jack Angstreich

2002 films
American documentary films
Films directed by Stephen Kijak
German documentary films
Documentary films about the film industry
2002 documentary films
Documentary films about fandom
Film and video fandom
2000s English-language films
2000s American films
2000s German films
English-language German films